Framus Five is a Czech rock band founded in Prague in 1963 and led by singer and guitarist Michal Prokop. The band also includes guitarist Luboš Andršt and violinist Jan Hrubý. The group disbanded in 1971 but reunited in 1978 under the slightly altered name Framus 5. They again ceased activity in 1990, due to Prokop's involvement in politics. They regrouped once more in 2000 and continue to play to this day.

History
Framus Five's debut album, Michal Prokop + Framus Five, released in 1968, was strongly influenced by American blues music. In 1970, the band was joined by guitarist Luboš Andršt and drummer Karel Káša Jahn. In 1971, they not only released a second album, titled Město ER, but also published an export edition of their debut, under the title Blues in Soul. With the advent of Normalization in Czechoslovakia after the 1968 Prague Spring, which effectively banned all English-language songs or names, Město ER was pulled from print, and the band disintegrated the year of its release.

Prokop subsequently sang in the band Šest strýců as well as with Eva Pilarová, among other projects. In 1978, he reformed his old band under the name Framus 5. The goup's lineup changed frequently during this time, with the only stable members being Prokop and Trnka. In 1984, violinist Jan Hrubý joined the ensemble, and they collaborated with poet Pavel Šrut and composer Petr Skoumal on their fourth studio album, Kolej Yesterday.

In 1990, Prokop put Framus 5 on hiatus as he got involved in Czechoslovak politics. He renewed the group once more in 2000 as Michal Prokop & Friends, and in 2006, a reformed Framus 5 emerged, with a mix of new and old musicians.

Band members
Current
 Michal Prokop – vocals, guitar
 Luboš Andršt – guitar
 Jan Hrubý – violin
 Jan Kolář – keyboards, oboe
 Zdeněk Tichota
 Pavel Razím
 Jiří Šíma
 Roman Němec

Former

 Ivan Trnka – keyboards
 Karel Káša Jahn – drums
 Ladislav Eliáš – bass
 Milan Vitoch – drums
 Rudolf Chundela – guitar
 Martin Koubek – guitar
 Tomáš Suchomel – drums
 Lubor Šonka – keyboards
 Miki Bláha – bass

 Michal Vrbovec – drums
 Jaroslav Petrásek
 Aleš Charvát – bass
 Jiří Burda – wind instruments
 Josef Šimon Kučera – wind instruments
 Vítězslav Müller – wind instruments
 Ivan Umáčený – wind instruments
 Petr Klarfeld – drums

Discography

Studio albums
 Framus Five + Michal Prokop (1968) (export version was released in 1971 as Blues in Soul)

 Město ER (1972)
 Holubí dante (1980)
 Kolej Yesterday (1984)
 Nic ve zlým, nic v dobrým (1987)
 Snad nám naše děti… (1989)
 Sto roků na cestě (2012)
 Mohlo by to bejt nebe… (2021)

Compilations
 Až si pro mě přijdou (1990)
 Pořád to platí 1968 – 1989 (6-disc box set – 2008)
 Už je to napořád 2000 – 2012 (2016)

Live albums
 Live 60 (as Michal Prokop, Framus Five & Hosté – 2006)

References

External links
 Michal Prokop's official website
 

Czech rock music groups
Musical groups established in 1963
1963 establishments in Czechoslovakia
Musical groups from Prague